Shahrak-e Changuleh (also Romanized as Shahrak-e Changūleh) is a village in Mohsen Ab Rural District, in the Central District of Mehran County, Ilam Province, Iran. At the 2006 census, its population was 1,254, in 276 families. The village is populated by Lurs.

References 

Populated places in Mehran County
Luri settlements in Ilam Province